Mechiel Versluis (born 29 July 1987) is a Dutch representative rower. He is a three time Olympian, an Olympic bronze medallist and was a world and European champion in 2013 in the coxless four.

He finished fifth in the coxless four at the 2012 Summer Olympics. At  the 2016 Summer Olympics in Rio de Janeiro he was part of the men's eight team that won a bronze medal. He won a medal at the 2019 World Rowing Championships.

References

External links

1987 births
Living people
Dutch male rowers
Rowers at the 2012 Summer Olympics
Olympic rowers of the Netherlands
People from Ooststellingwerf
Sportspeople from Friesland
World Rowing Championships medalists for the Netherlands
Rowers at the 2016 Summer Olympics
Olympic bronze medalists for the Netherlands
Olympic medalists in rowing
Medalists at the 2016 Summer Olympics
Rowers at the 2020 Summer Olympics
21st-century Dutch people
20th-century Dutch people